Kingslayer may refer to:

 The Kingslayer, a 1949 short story collection by L. Ron Hubbard
 Jaime Lannister, a fictional character in the A Song of Ice and Fire series
 Malo kingi, a jellyfish known as the common kingslayer
 Seth Rollins (born 1986), nicknamed the "Kingslayer" in WWE
 A Super Friends villain
 "Kingslayer", a song by Bring Me the Horizon featuring Babymetal from the commercial release Post Human: Survival Horror, 2020
 "Kingslayer", a song by Grand Magus from the album Wolf's Return, 2005

See also 
 Regicide